The Department Of the Navy Acquisition Intern Program is a civilian (not active duty in the military) professional hiring program.  The Naval Acquisition Career Center manages several hundred interns at any given time.

The internship is two and one half years, but may vary in length depending on the program the intern applies for.  The career fields available are Business/Cost Estimating and Financial Management, Contracting, Communications/Computer Systems, Acquisition Logistics, Systems Planning, Research, Development and Engineering, or Manufacturing, Production and Quality Assurance.  This is an excepted service position.

Interns can choose a variety of locations in which to live.  While this program is designed for those just out of college that is certainly not the rule.  There are many interns that are non-traditional and the Navy encourages veterans as well as non-veterans to apply for positions through this program.  There are GPA requirements for each career field, see job descriptions below.  Some internships require the completion of a senior project.

The program has been converted from the General Schedule pay scale to the National Security Personnel System pay for performance.

The 'Naval Acquisition Career Center bulletin board  is the primary vehicle for collective communication to the intern workforce, their supervisors and the CFMs, as well as other interested parties.

Organization
The Naval Acquisition Career Center is organized to provide the Naval Acquisition Intern Program with support for all aspects of the program. Under the lead of the director, intern operations are primarily under the direction of the Acquisition Intern Program Division Head with other administrative support coming from the Operations Division.

 Ronald Fevola - Acquisition Intern Program Division Head
 Hugh Smith - Director Naval Acquisition Career Center

Job descriptions and position qualifications
Community Planner (0020 job series) positions provide contractor guidance and documentation to assure contract compliance and quality assurance as pertains to facility planning, regional planning, special project planning, safety site planning, and economic analysis. Provides direct support to in-house and contracted planning projects by using technical skills and techniques. Interpret laws, regulations and policies and apply technical principles, practices and theories. Related Degrees: Urban Development & Planning, Architecture, Landscape Architecture, Economics, Geography  Requires a minimum GPA of 2.95, based on the bachelor's degree.

Computer Scientist (1550 job series) positions involve the application of, or research into, computer science methods and techniques to store, manipulate, transform or present information by means of computer systems. This involves the development, test, and evaluation of automated systems, programs, hardware and software interfacing techniques, and adapting advanced methods and techniques in computer science to solve computer processing requirements. Related Degrees: Computer Science  Requires a minimum GPA of 2.75, based on the bachelor's degree.

Contract Specialist (1102 job series) positions are involved in the acquisition of supplies and services. Assignments may include requirements determination and contract planning, business evaluation and price-cost analysis, negotiation, contract administration, and contract termination. Related Degrees: Any Business Degree  Requires a minimum GPA of 2.95, based on the bachelor's degree.

Engineering (800 job series) positions perform professional engineering tasks to support acquisition programs, projects and activities. These may relate to the design, development, construction, fabrication, installation, modification and analysis of platforms (ships and airplanes); equipment; systems or system components; facilities; environmental protection, etc. Typical specialties may include aerospace, computer, electrical, electronics, chemical, architect, fire protection, environmental, marine, ocean, materials, civil, industrial, mechanical engineering and naval architect. Related Degrees: Any Professional Engineering Degree and MBA  Requires a minimum GPA of 2.75, based on the bachelor's degree.

Financial Management Analyst (501 job series) perform, advise on, or supervise work in any of the phases of budget administration when such work requires knowledge and skill in applying budget-related laws, regulations, policies, precedents, methods, and techniques. This typically involves analytical, technical, and administrative duties in one or more phases of the budgetary process, e.g. budget formulation and justification, presentation and enactment, or execution. Related Degrees: Finance, Accounting, or other Business  Requires a minimum GPA of 2.95, based on the bachelor's degree.

Logistics Management Specialist (346 job series) positions are involved in the identification of activities involved in providing logistics support, the integration of actions required of each activity into a logistics plan, the monitoring of progress in meeting the  requirements, the adjustments of logistics plans and schedules for all related actions, and coordination of efforts to effect the plan. This includes determining requirements for funds, manpower, facilities, equipment, transportation, communications, training, supplies and support services; as well as, the design and development, procurement, production, storage, maintenance, utilization and disposal of supplies and equipment. They are also involved in acquisition of required support services such as transportation and communications and in the acquisition and training of personnel. Related Degrees: Supply Chain Management, or other Business  Requires a minimum GPA of 2.95, based on the bachelor's degree.

Natural Resources Specialist (401 job series) positions are involved in directing program requirements for natural resources consultation, technical reviews, and guidance on facility planning efforts, design and construction projects, real estate actions, environmental compliance documentation, and development of Integrated Natural Resources Management Plans for Navy and Marine Corps activities. Related Degrees: Biology, Natural Resource Management, Environmental Protection/Science  Requires a minimum GPA of 2.95, based on the bachelor's degree.

Operations Research Analyst (1515 job series) positions perform professional and scientific work requiring the design, development and adaptation of mathematical, statistical, econometric, and other scientific methods and techniques to analyze problems of management and to provide advice and insight about the probable effects of alternative solutions to these problems. The primary requirement of the work is competence in the methods of scientific inquiry and analysis rather than in the subject matter of the problem. Related Degrees: Operations Research, Mathematics or Statistics  Requires a minimum GPA of 2.95, based on the bachelor's degree.

Psychologist (0180 job series) Conducts analysis for programs relating to military training, interacting with groups engaged in the conduct of instructional systems evaluations, training effectiveness assessments, training management studies/organizational analyses, staff studies, and other training analyses. Related Degrees: Industrial /Organizational, Human Factor, Cognitive, Experimental or Educational Psychology  Requires a minimum GPA of 2.95 based on the bachelor's degree.

Realty Specialist (1170 job series) positions are involved in the identification of real estate requirements, including the design and preparation of real estate acquisition documents, obtaining and preparing documentation, planning and executing major administrative actions, analyzing proposed easements, leases, licenses, host-tenant real estate, and use agreements. Also involves the preparation of documents for disposal of excess property; and, providing technical advice to Navy and Marine Corps regarding real estate actions. Related Degrees: Realty, Urban Development & Planning  Requires a minimum GPA of 2.95, based on the bachelor's degree.

Application information
The Naval Acquisition Intern Program uses the Office of Personnel Management's (OPM) USA Staffing Tool, Application Manager , as its one stop source for applying to the program. Application Manager is a web-based program available for applicants to apply. It automates the applicant recruitment, qualification assessment, referral, and notification processes. Applicants complete the on-line application process and submit a resume and transcripts; preferably through the "upload process", to be considered.

The primary Naval Acquisition Intern Program recruiting method is an on-campus approach at colleges and universities to attract applicants to meet the needs of the Department of Navy Acquisition Workforce. Participating commands represent the program at colleges and universities during the spring recruiting season. In most cases, Navy civilian representatives from participating commands will be on-campus to recruit at events scheduled through college placement offices.

Occasionally, Naval Acquisition Intern Program vacancies that are open to the public will be posted and filled through OPM's USAJOBS website: . It is possible to use the Job Search Agent function in My USAJOBS to build an ongoing search for "Naval Acquisition Intern Program" jobs.

Participating commands

The following is a list of mission statements of commands that participate in the Navy Acquisition Intern program.

Naval Air Systems Command (NAVAIR)[www.navair.navy.mil]
Serves the nation and the Navy by developing, acquiring, and supporting naval aeronautical and related technology systems with which the operating forces, in support of the Unified Commanders and our allies, can train and fight.

Naval Sea Systems Command (NAVSEA)[www.navsea.navy.mil]
The largest of the Navy's five systems commands, Naval Sea Systems Command (NAVSEA) engineers, builds and supports America's Fleet of ships and combat systems.

Naval Facilities Engineering Command (NAVFAC)
To manage the planning, design and construction of shore facilities for U.S. Navy activities around the world.

Naval Supply Systems Command (NAVSUP)[www.navsup.navy.mil]
To provide U.S. Naval Forces with supplies and services.

Space And Naval Warfare Systems Command (SPAWAR)
Provides the warfighter with knowledge superiority by developing, delivering, and maintaining effective, capable and integrated command, control, communications, computer, intelligence and surveillance systems.

Marine Corps
To serve as the Commandant's principal agent for equipping the Operating Forces to accomplish their warfighting mission.

Military Sealift Command (MSC)
To provide ocean transportation of equipment, fuel, supplies and ammunition to sustain U.S. forces worldwide during peacetime and in war.

Navy International Program Office (NIPO) 
Provides assistance to America's Allies, partners, and friends within the framework of U.S. laws, DoD policy, and congressional guidance.

Office of Naval Research (ONR)
Coordinates, executes, and promotes the science and technology programs of the United States Navy and Marine Corps through universities, government laboratories, and nonprofit and for-profit organizations.

Strategic Systems Program Office (SSP)
The Strategic Systems Programs organization began with the POLARIS program and continues with the Ohio (SSBN-726)-class Trident submarines.

Navy Engineering Logistics Office (NELO)
The Navy Engineering Logistics Office provides engineering logistics support. This involves engineering logistics, transportation, and other business and supply-related support to the Fleet and shore establishment within the Department of the Navy.

External links
 https://web.archive.org/web/20080615225030/http://acquisition.navy.mil/career_management/interns 

Other Links:
 http://www.dodvets.com/intern.asp
 http://findarticles.com/p/articles/mi_m0FWK/is_n2_v18/ai_19488277

References

Sea Systems
Military in Washington, D.C.